is a Japanese voice actress and singer affiliated with Style Cube. Her major voice roles include Nanako Usami in Locodol, Ann Akagi in Action Heroine Cheer Fruits, Kokoro Tsurumaki in BanG Dream!, Miku Nakano in The Quintessential Quintuplets, and Hougetsu Shimamura in Adachi and Shimamura.

She joined StylipS on April 28, 2013 along with Style Cube Kenshuusei client Moe Toyota. She is also a member of Pyxis with Toyota. Itō's hobbies and preferences are related to Super Sentai and Kamen Rider.

Biography

Itō belongs to Style Cube as a trainee and in 2012 she passed Style Cube's 1st Voice Actor Audition. In 2013, she joined the StylipS voice acting unit with Moe Toyota, a fellow trainee. In 2014, she debuted in a television anime as Nanako Usami in Locodol. In May 2015, Itō formed a new unit Pyxis with Moe Toyota. In February 2016, she held her first one-man live performance, and in October 2016 she released her debut single "Awa to Berbane" from Japan Columbia, making her solo debut as a singer.

Filmography

Anime television series
2013
Chronicles of the Going Home Club – Shieru Akabane
Gargantia on the Verdurous Planet – Dancer
Wanna Be the Strongest in the World – Yuho Mochizuki

2014
Black Bullet – Mai
Locodol – Nanako Usami
The Comic Artist and His Assistants – Suino Sahoto

2015
Ani Tore! EX – Asami Hoshi
Million Doll – Mariko
Re-Kan! – Narumi Inoue, Grandma Inoue
Yurikuma Arashi – Katyusha Akae

2016
Anitore! XX – Asami Hoshi
Handa-kun – Maiko Mori
Mahou Shoujo Nante Mouiidesukara – Mafuyu Shinogi, Girl C

2017
Action Heroine Cheer Fruits – Ann Akagi
Armed Girl's Machiavellism – Nono Mozunono
Chain Chronicle ~Light of Haecceitas~ – Lilith

2018
BanG Dream! Girls Band Party! Pico – Kokoro Tsurumaki
Sword Art Online: Alicization – Frenika
The Ryuo's Work Is Never Done! – Sasari Oga

2019
BanG Dream! 2nd Season – Kokoro Tsurumaki
How Clumsy you are, Miss Ueno – Yomogi Tanaka
Hulaing Babies – Miku
The Quintessential Quintuplets – Miku Nakano

2020
Adachi and Shimamura – Hougetsu Shimamura
Assault Lily Bouquet – Yuri Hitotsuyanagi, Friend
BanG Dream! 3rd Season – Kokoro Tsurumaki
BanG Dream! Girls Band Party! Pico: Ohmori – Kokoro Tsurumaki
Gleipnir – Nana Mifune
Hulaing Babies☆Petit – Miku
Nekopara – Maple
Princess Connect! Re:Dive – Kokkoro/Kokoro Natsume
Sorcerous Stabber Orphen – Fiena

2021
BanG Dream! Girls Band Party! Pico Fever! – Kokoro Tsurumaki
Combatants Will Be Dispatched! – Russell of the Water
How Not to Summon a Demon Lord Ω – Lumachina Weselia
I've Been Killing Slimes for 300 Years and Maxed Out My Level – Fatla
Muv-Luv Alternative – Chizuru Sakaki
PuraOre! Pride of Orange – Yuka Iihara
Suppose a Kid from the Last Dungeon Boonies Moved to a Starter Town – Phyllo
Takt Op. Destiny – Titan
The Aquatope on White Sand – Kukuru Misakino
The Quintessential Quintuplets 2nd Season – Miku Nakano
Yūki Yūna wa Yūsha de Aru Churutto! – Renge Miroku

2022
Akebi's Sailor Uniform – Neko Kamimoku
Love Flops – Aoi Izumisawa, Ai Izawa
Princess Connect! Re:Dive Season 2 – Kokkoro/Kokoro Natsume

2023
Isekai Shōkan wa Nidome Desu – Alize
Kubo Won't Let Me Be Invisible – Akina Kubo
Masamune-kun's Revenge R – Muriel Besson
Spy Classroom – Grete

TBA
Seiyū Radio no Ura Omote – Yasumi Utatane/Yumiko Satō

Theatrical animation
 The Idolmaster Movie: Beyond the Brilliant Future! (2014) – Yuriko Nanao
 Mazinger Z: Infinity (2018)
 BanG Dream! Film Live (2019) – Kokoro Tsurumaki
 BanG Dream! Film Live 2nd Stage (2021) – Kokoro Tsurumaki
 The Quintessential Quintuplets Movie (2022) – Miku Nakano

OVA
 Locodol (OVA 1, 2014; OVA 2, 2015; OVA 3, 2016) – Nanako Usami
Fragtime (2019) – Misuzu Moritani

Live-Action Drama/Movies
Kamen Rider Zero-One the Movie: Real×Time - Announcer Humagear
Kamen Rider Revice - Lovekov

Video games

2013
The Idolmaster Million Live! – Yuriko Nanao
Girl Friend Beta – Kei Asami

2014
Mikomori – Yukari Tsukino

2015
Kaden Shojo – Kozue, Shizuku, Chino, Madoka (Game ceased their services on March 31, 2016)
Quiz RPG: The World of Mystic Wiz – Tomi Kotobuki
Xuccess Heaven – Suzu
White Cat Project – Chocolat
Shingun Destroy! – Yuriko Nanao
Schoolgirl Strikers – Chika Wakatsuki
Nekosaba – Kaito Niyaito, Blau
Yome Collection – Narumi Inoue, Herself

2016
 Alternative Girls – Nono Asahina
 Shooting Girls – Kiriko Sakaki
 Friends of Leirya – Kaitō nyaito
 Riku ☆ Grandpa – 74 Tank Collection, 155mm Howitzer

2017
 Lala Maji: Honha Lara MAGIC – Minami Sakura
 BanG Dream! Girls Band Party! – Tsurumaki Kokoro
 Endride - X fragments - – Lieber
 The Idolmaster Million Live! Theater Days – Nanao Yuriko
 Unmanned War 2099 – Wang Ming Ling
 Mon Musume ☆ is Reimu – Amaterasu
 Yuki Yuna is a Hero: Hanayui no Kirameki - Renge Miroku

2018
  Princess Connect! Re:Dive – Kokkoro

2019
 Granblue Fantasy – Kolulu
 Gunvolt Chronicles: Luminous Avenger Ix – Isora
 Girls' Frontline – HS2000, Type 4
 Punishing: Gray Raven – Liv

2020
 Criminal Girls X - Usagi
 Dragalia Lost – Mitsuba
 Dragon Raja – Erii Uesugi

2021
 The Legend of Heroes: Kuro no Kiseki – Agnes Claudel
 A Certain Magical Index: Imaginary Fest – Fran Karasuma

2022
 Azur Lane – HMS Indomitable (92)
 The Diofield Chronicle – Lorraine Lucksaw
 The Legend of Heroes: Kuro no Kiseki II – Crimson Sin – Agnes Claudel
 Samurai Maiden – Iyo

Drama CD 
2013
 Kono danshi, akunin to yoba remasu. – Akane
 Nami Eleanorima Drama CD Vol. 3 "Unrequited love" – Haruna Kosaka

2014
 PERFECT IDOL THE MOVIE – Nanao Yuriko
 Locodol – Usami Nanako

2015
 The Idolmaster Million Live! Series – Nanao Yuriko

Discography

Album

Singles

References

External links 
 Official blog 
 Official agency profile 
 Official music website 
 Happy Style 
 

1996 births
Living people
Anime singers
Japanese video game actresses
Japanese voice actresses
Japanese women pop singers
Nippon Columbia artists
StylipS members
Voice actresses from Tokyo